Patrick Chinyemba (born 3 January 2001) is a Zambian boxer. He competed in the men's flyweight event at the 2020 Summer Olympics.

Chinyemba was selected to be part of Team Zambia for the Birmingham 2022 Commonwealth Games to compete under the flyweight boxing category.

Round of 16
Won via RSC (Referee Stops Contest) against Charles Fauma Keama of Papua New Guinea

Quarter-Final
Won via Knock Out against Alex Winwood of Australia

Semi-Final (Bronze Medal Fight)
Lost via a unanimous point decision 5-0 against Subedar Amit of India to settle for Bronze

References

External links

2001 births
Living people
Zambian male boxers
Olympic boxers of Zambia
Boxers at the 2020 Summer Olympics
Place of birth missing (living people)
Flyweight boxers
Boxers at the 2022 Commonwealth Games
Commonwealth Games bronze medallists for Zambia
Commonwealth Games medallists in boxing
Medallists at the 2022 Commonwealth Games